Newman Cox (13 March 1867 – 2 January 1938) was a Guyanese cricketer. He played in seven first-class matches for British Guiana from 1887 to 1896.

See also
 List of Guyanese representative cricketers

References

External links
 

1867 births
1938 deaths
Guyanese cricketers
Guyana cricketers